Koons Airport  is a privately owned, public use airport located two nautical miles (4 km) southwest of the central business district of Salem, in Columbiana County, Ohio, United States

Facilities and aircraft 
Koons Airport covers an area of 23 acres (9 ha) at an elevation of 1,327 feet (404 m) above mean sea level. It has one runway designated 9/27 with a turf surface measuring 1,850 by 100 feet (564 x 30 m).

For the 12-month period ending August 12, 2011, the airport had 2,546 aircraft operations, an average of 212 per month: 99.8% general aviation and 0.2% military. At that time there were eight aircraft based at this airport: 87.5% single-engine and 12.5% ultralight.

References

External links 
 Aerial image as of April 1994 from USGS The National Map

Airports in Ohio
Transportation in Columbiana County, Ohio